Changin' the Game is the sixth studio album by American rapper and record producer Uncle Luke. It was released on November 11, 1997 through Luke Records/Island Black Music. Production was handled by Danny Spohn, Derrick Hill, Gusto, Lil' Jon, Louis "Ugly" Howard, Rod XL, Tony Galvin, and Luke himself, who also served as executive producer together with Hiriam Hicks. It features guest appearances from No Good-N-Jiggie, Aaron Hall, Melvin Riley and Choclatt. The album peaked at number 49 on the US Billboard Top R&B/Hip-Hop Albums chart. However, the single "Raise the Roof" found success reaching No. 26 on the Billboard Hot 100 and topped the Hot Rap Singles. The song helped to popularize the arm gesture by the same name which involved repeatedly extending ones arms upwards with the palms of the hands also facing upwards. The song is also featured in the 1998 compilation album Jock Jams, Volume 4.

Track listing

Charts

References

External links

1997 albums
Luke Records albums
Luther Campbell albums
Albums produced by Lil Jon
Albums produced by Luther Campbell